American country artist Kathy Mattea has won ten awards and has received 23 nominations for her work. Mattea has won four awards from the Academy of Country Music, including two for her 1988 single, "Eighteen Wheels and a Dozen Roses". She has received four awards from the Country Music Association, including two for Female Vocalist of the Year. Mattea has also won two Grammy Awards. Her first was for her 1989 single, "Where've You Been". Mattea has also received two nominations from the American Music Awards for her recordings in the early 1990s.

Academy of Country Music Awards

!
|-
| 1983
| rowspan="3"| Kathy Mattea
| Top New Female Vocalist
| 
| align="center" rowspan="10"| 
|-
| 1987
| rowspan="2"| Top Female Vocalist
| 
|-
| rowspan="3"| 1988
| 
|-
| rowspan="2"| "Eighteen Wheels and a Dozen Roses"
| Single of the Year
| 
|-
| Song of the Year
| 
|-
| rowspan="3"| 1989
| Album of the Year
| Willow in the Wind
| 
|-
| Kathy Mattea
| Top Female Vocalist
| 
|-
| "Where've You Been"
| Song of the Year
| 
|-
| 1990
| Kathy Mattea
| Top Female Vocalist
| 
|-
| 1997
| "455 Rocket"
| Video of the Year
| 
|-
|}

American Music Awards

!
|-
| 1989
| "Eighteen Wheels and a Dozen Roses"
| Favorite Country Song
| 
| align="center"| 
|-
| 1991
| rowspan="2"| Kathy Mattea
| rowspan="2"| Favorite Country Female Artist
| 
| align="center"| 
|-
| 1992
| 
| align="center"| 
|-
|}

Country Music Association Awards

!
|-
| 1986
| rowspan="2"| Kathy Mattea
| Horizon Award
| 
| align="center" rowspan="15"| 
|-
| rowspan="2"| 1987
| Female Vocalist of the Year
| 
|-
| "Walk the Way the Wind Blows"
| Single of the Year
| 
|-
| rowspan="3"| 1988
| Untasted Honey
| Album of the Year
| 
|-
| Kathy Mattea
| Female Vocalist of the Year
| 
|-
| "Eighteen Wheels and a Dozen Roses"
| Single of the Year
| 
|-
| rowspan="2"| 1989
| Willow in the Wind
| Album of the Year
| 
|-
| rowspan="3"| Kathy Mattea
| Female Vocalist of the Year
| 
|-
| rowspan="4"| 1990
| Entertainer of the Year
| 
|-
| Female Vocalist of the Year
| 
|-
| rowspan="2"| "Where've You Been"
| Music Video of the Year 
| 
|-
| Single of the Year
| 
|-
| 1991
| Kathy Mattea
| Female Vocalist of the Year
| 
|-
| rowspan="2"| 1997
| "455 Rocket"
| Music Video of the Year 
| 
|-
| "You've Got a Friend in Me" 
| Vocal Event of the Year
| 
|-
|}

Grammy Awards

!
|-
| 1987
| "Love at the Five and Dime"
| rowspan="4"| Best Female Country Vocal Performance
| 
| align="center" rowspan="8"| 
|-
| 1990
| Willow in the Wind
| 
|-
| 1991
| "Where've You Been"
| 
|-
| 1992
| Time Passes By
| 
|-
| rowspan="2"| 1994
| "Romeo" 
| Best Country Collaboration with Vocals
| 
|-
| Good News
| Best Southern, Country or Bluegrass Gospel Album
| 
|-
| 1995
| "Teach Your Children" 
| Best Country Collaboration with Vocals
| 
|-
| 2009
| Coal
| Best Traditional Folk Album
| 
|-
|}

References

Lists of awards received by American musician